Megacraspedus aenictodes is a moth of the family Gelechiidae. It was described by Turner in 1919. It is found in Australia, where it has been recorded from Queensland.

The forewings are fuscous with a rather narrow whitish costal streak from near the base to three-fifths. The hindwings are grey.

References

Moths described in 1919
Megacraspedus